The Godak minarali mosque is a historical-architectural monument of the 19 th century. It is located in the territory of the Yukhari Bash State Historical-Architectural Reserve in Sheki, Azerbaijan.

The mosque was included in the list of immovable historical and cultural monuments of local importance by decision No. 132 issued by the Cabinet of Ministers of the Republic of Azerbaijan on August 2, 2001.

On July 7, 2019, "the historic center of Sheki together with the Khan Palace" was included in the UNESCO World Heritage List. The Godek minaret mosque located in the historical center of Sheki is included in the World Heritage.

About 
The Godak minarali mosque is located in the Sarı Toprak neighborhood of Sheki city. The house of worship, which is part of the Yukhari Bash State Historical-Architecture Reserve, was built by Haji Abdurrahman Bey and Haji Sadreddin Bey in 1226 (1811 AD) according to the Hijri-Lunar calendar. It is possible to determine the construction date of the mosque from the inscription above the entrance door.

On the inscription is written in Arabic:

The mosque was built of stone and brick, consists of two rooms and a corridor. The ceiling of the mosque is made of mesh. Since there were no traces of the ceiling of the Sheki Khan mosque, which was restored in 2021-2022, and there was no photo of the ceiling, the restorers assembled a new ceiling for the mosque on the basis of the network on the ceiling of the Gödek minarali mosque and the Sheki Khan Palace. The mosque has a minaret. It is impossible to climb up because the stairs inside it have collapsed.

There are three graves in the yard. It is said that one of these graves belongs to Haji Sadreddin Bey, who died in 1254 (1838).

During the Soviet occupation 
After the Soviet occupation, the fight against the religion was declared officially since 1928. In December of the same year, the Central Committee of the Communist Party of Azerbaijan handed over many mosques, churches and synagogues to clubs for use in educational purposes. If in 1917 there were 3,000 mosques in Azerbaijan, in 1927 this number was 1,700, and in 1933 it was 17.

After the occupation, a kindergarten was located in the building of the mosque.

After independence 
The mosque was included in the list of immovable historical and cultural monuments of local importance by decision No. 132 issued by the Cabinet of Ministers of the Republic of Azerbaijan on August 2, 2001.

Since 2001, the historical part of the city of Sheki has been selected as a candidate for the UNESCO World Heritage List. On July 7, 2019, "the historic center of Sheki together with the Khan Palace" was included in the UNESCO World Heritage List. The decision was made at the 43 rd session of the UNESCO World Heritage Committee held at the Baku Congress Center. The Gödek minarali mosque located in the historical center of Sheki is included in the World Heritage.

Gallery

See also 
 Shaki Khans' Mosque
 Gilahli Mosque in Sheki

References

Mosques in Shaki